The Corridor Cities Transitway (CCT) proposal is for a  bus rapid transit line in Maryland that would run from the Shady Grove Metro station in Gaithersburg northwest to Clarksburg. The proposed master plans for Montgomery County and Frederick County provide for the eventual extension of the CCT northward along I-270 into Frederick City. The project is in jeopardy now that funding is not available from the state and the project has been removed from the development and evaluation phase of the Consolidated Transportation Plan. “'From all indications, the project is dead,' said state Del. Kirill Reznik (D-Montgomery)."

History 

On August 5, 2013, the State of Maryland announced that $100 million has been budgeted for planning, final design, and right-of-way acquisition for the first phase of the project, which comprises  of the route. As of 2012, the Phase I cost was estimated at $545 million, and the total project cost was estimated to be $828 million. No funding has been allocated for the second phase, which would cover the remaining . The state is applying for federal grants for the project.

A study was performed by the Maryland Transit Administration in coordination with the larger I-270/US 15 Multi-Modal Corridor Study conducted by the Maryland Department of Transportation, examining multiple options for the region including possible Express toll lanes along I-270.

Funding for the project was not included in Maryland's proposed transportation budget, pushing the project out at least six years. Subsequently, the state removed the project from the development and evaluation phase of the Consolidated Transportation Plan. "The state’s change is a death knell for the long-anticipated project ... said state Del. Kirill Reznik."

Erin Henson, spokeswoman for the Maryland Department of Transportation, said the state would only be involved if the project connected “multiple jurisdictions in more than one county" but the CCT “is solely located in one county, making Montgomery County the lead for future work on this local project.”

References

External links 
 "Corridor Cities Transitway" - Main project site (Maryland Transit Administration)
 Maryland State Highway Administration - Draft Environmental Impact Statement and Section 4(f) Evaluation
 Action Committee for Transit - A group supporting transit in Maryland.
 BeyondDC: Corridor Cities Controversy - A critique of planning for the proposed route.

Light rail in Maryland
Bus rapid transit in Maryland
Washington Metro
Proposed bus rapid transit in the United States
Proposed public transportation in Maryland